True Love is a studio album by the American country musician Don Williams. It was released on August 7, 1990, via RCA Records. The album includes the singles "Back in My Younger Days", "True Love" and "Lord Have Mercy on a Country Boy".

Production
The album was coproduced by Williams and Garth Fundis. "Just 'Cause I'm in Love with You" is a cover of the Jesse Winchester song.

Critical reception

The Province wrote that "Williams's classic unadorned signature ... is lukewarm on True Love." The Chicago Tribune deemed the album an "unusually rhythmic collection," writing that Williams's voice "remains as warm as a favorite memory." The Buffalo News opined that "nobody sings about the average lives of average Americans with more poignancy than Don Williams." The Orange County Register noted that "Lord, Have Mercy on a Country Boy" "may be the least preachy and most elegant song yet about the devastation to our environment."

Track listing

Chart performance

References

Don Williams albums
1990 albums
RCA Records albums
Albums produced by Garth Fundis